Rudi Istenič (born 10 January 1971) is a Slovenian former professional footballer who played as a midfielder.

Club career
Born to Slovenian parents in Cologne, West Germany, he played as a youngster at Germania Hackenbroich and Bayer Dormagen. After a spell at SV Straelen, he played in the Bundesliga with Fortuna Düsseldorf. Later he played for KFC Uerdingen 05, Eintracht Braunschweig and KSV Hessen Kassel.

International career
Istenič made 17 appearances for the senior Slovenia national team. He was a participant at the UEFA Euro 2000.

References

External links 
Rudi Istenič at NZS 

Living people
1971 births
Footballers from Cologne
Slovenian footballers
Association football midfielders
Slovenia international footballers
UEFA Euro 2000 players
SV 19 Straelen players
Fortuna Düsseldorf players
KFC Uerdingen 05 players
Eintracht Braunschweig players
Eintracht Braunschweig II players
KSV Hessen Kassel players
Bundesliga players
2. Bundesliga players
Slovenian expatriate footballers
Slovenian expatriate sportspeople in Germany
Expatriate footballers in Germany